Joseph Xu Honggen (born April 1962) is a Chinese Catholic priest and Bishop of the Roman Catholic Diocese of Suzhou since 2005.

Biography
Xu was born in Suzhou, Jiangsu, in April 1962, to a Catholic family. He graduated from Sheshan Seminary. After college, he was assigned to the Roman Catholic Diocese of Suzhou. Two years later, he went to the United States, where he studied at the St. Joseph's College and Catholic Theological Union. He was ordained a priest in 1990 by bishop Matthias Ma Longlin.

Xu returned to China in June 1999 and that same year became Bishop of the Roman Catholic Diocese of Suzhou, which was approved by the Pope Benedict XVI. In October 2016, he was received by the Pope Francis.

References

1962 births
People from Suzhou
Living people
St. Joseph's College (New York) alumni
Catholic Theological Union alumni
21st-century Roman Catholic bishops in China